Osong station is a train station on the Honam and Gyeongbu high-speed railways in Cheongju City, North Chungcheong Province, South Korea. It is located at the intersection of the Gyeongbu KTX high-speed rail line, the conventional Chungbuk Line and, since April 2015, the Honam high-speed railway. KTX trains began calling there from November 1, 2010, bringing high-speed rail service to the nearby city of Cheongju.

Not all KTX trains call at Osong; only a select number of trains per day in each direction stop there.

While not directly attached to the station, there is a KTX test track that connects with the lines just north of the station. The facility is named 철도종합시험선로 and was expanded in 2019.

Criticism
The Gyeongbu high-speed railway was originally not planned to have a station in North Chungcheong Province. The railway was also planned to be built across Sejong City instead of Cheongju. After the initial plan was revealed, residents of Cheongju insisted that authorities build Gyeongbu HSR across Cheongju and build a station there, and threatened to blow up the HSR if they did not build Osong station.

In fact, there wasn't any plans about Sejong City by then. However, if there was no Osong Station, there would be no station on North Chungcheong Province even though Kyeongbu HSR passes North Chungcheong Province.

The real problem with this station is that it was selected as a branching station for the Gyeongbu and Honam high-speed railway. As a result, The price of the round-trip KTX from Yongsan station to GwangjuSongjeong Station has increased 6200 won more and Distance from Yongsan to Gwangju increased 19km.

Notes

External links
 Cyber station information from Korail

Railway stations in North Chungcheong Province
Cheongju
Railway stations opened in 1921
Korea Train Express stations